Mylchytsi is a village in Lviv Raion, Lviv Oblast, Ukraine. It belongs to Horodok urban hromada, one of the hromadas of Ukraine. 

Until 18 July 2020, Mylchytsi belonged to Horodok Raion. The raion was abolished in July 2020 as part of the administrative reform of Ukraine, which reduced the number of raions of Lviv Oblast to seven. The area of Horodok Raion was merged into Lviv Raion.

References

Villages in Lviv Raion